Maurio McCoy (born November 18, 1995) is a regular-footed American professional skateboarder from Reading, Pennsylvania.

Skateboarding

Skate video parts 
 2018: Til the End Vol. 1 - Santa Cruz
 2018: Til the End Vol. 2 - Santa Cruz

Competitions
In July 2019, McCoy placed second at the Street League Skateboarding Championship - Los Angeles, finishing behind Yuto Horigome and ahead of Vincent Milou.

References 

Living people
American skateboarders
African-American skateboarders
1998 births
21st-century African-American sportspeople